Mâconnais Beaujolais Agglomération is the communauté d'agglomération, an intercommunal structure, centred on the city of Mâcon. It is located in the Saône-et-Loire and Ain departments, in the Bourgogne-Franche-Comté and Auvergne-Rhône-Alpes regions, eastern France. Created in 2017, its seat is in Mâcon. Its area is 298.2 km2. Its population was 78,281 in 2019, of which 33,908 in Mâcon proper.

Composition
The communauté d'agglomération consists of the following 39 communes, of which one (Saint-Laurent-sur-Saône) in the Ain department:

Azé
Berzé-la-Ville
Bussières
Chaintré
Chânes
La Chapelle-de-Guinchay
Charbonnières
Charnay-lès-Mâcon
Chasselas
Chevagny-les-Chevrières
Crêches-sur-Saône
Davayé
Fuissé
Hurigny
Igé
Laizé
Leynes
Mâcon
Milly-Lamartine
Péronne
Prissé
Pruzilly
La Roche-Vineuse
Romanèche-Thorins
Saint-Amour-Bellevue
Saint-Laurent-sur-Saône
Saint-Martin-Belle-Roche
Saint-Maurice-de-Satonnay
Saint-Symphorien-d'Ancelles
Saint-Vérand
La Salle
Sancé
Senozan
Sologny
Solutré-Pouilly
Varennes-lès-Mâcon
Vergisson
Verzé
Vinzelles

References

Maconnais Beaujolais
Maconnais Beaujolais
Maconnais Beaujolais